Paul Eugène Célestin Perquer (born 3 October 1859, date of death unknown) was a French sailor who competed in the 1900 Summer Olympics in Paris, France. Perquer took the gold in the 10 to 20 ton.

References

External links

 

1859 births
French male sailors (sport)
Sailors at the 1900 Summer Olympics – 10 to 20 ton
Olympic sailors of France
Year of death missing
Sportspeople from Le Havre
Olympic gold medalists for France
Olympic medalists in sailing
Medalists at the 1900 Summer Olympics
Place of death missing